Bikroy.com is a classified advertisements website operating in Bangladesh. Bikroy.com is available in English and Bengali.

Overview
Bikroy.com was launched in 2012 and has sections dedicated to private and business advertisements for cars and vehicles, property, electronics, home appliances and personal items, sport and hobby items, and jobs, among others.

Classified advertisements are currently placed on Bikroy.com and remain on the site for a period of 60 days. Bikroy.com is available in English and Bengali.

The site came into the local media spotlight following a formal press conference event held in Dhaka on 18 October 2012.

Background 
Bikroy is owned by a global tech firm – Saltside Technologies. Saltside Technologies is a Sweden-based, last stage venture funded company with US$65 million funding as of January 2015. Saltside Technologies has established classified sites such as Tonaton.com in Ghana, Efritin.com in Nigeria, and Ikman.lk in Sri Lanka, in addition to Bikroy.com in Bangladesh.

Paid features

Memberships 
Bikroy launched membership services in May 2016, which allowed users to have a dedicated page of their own with business details, photos and all their advertisements. Members could post extended numbers of advertisements through different membership packages and receive free promotions, shop stickers, business cards and a dedicated team for assistance.

Banner advertisements 
Advertisers can purchase banner placements on the desktop, mobile, and app versions of the site.

Buy Now 
Bikroy steps into the e-commerce arena with its online marketplace services. The platform now allows buying products directly online and receiving the product by home delivery using the service called buy now.

History

2012 

On 18 October 2012, Bikroy was formally launched in a press conference held in Bangladesh's capital city Dhaka but had begun operations in June earlier that year. The story was covered by several major newspapers in the country, including Prothom Alo and The Daily Star. In November 2012, Bikroy was named as the "Country's first bilingual classified website" by The Daily Star as it supported Bengali and English languages.

2013 

In 2013, "Bikroy.com" was the 4th most searched keyword in Bangladesh that year on Google. The company gained over 500,000 fans on Facebook.

2014 

During this year, the company opened a total of five offices in Bangladesh and their Facebook page reached 2,000,000 fans.

2015 

The launch of Bikroy application on iOS and Android was one of the major milestones that year.

2016 

This year the company launched a Membership service for small businesses, allowing them to advertise their products under their own page on Bikroy. Bikroy was ranked in the top three, right after Facebook and Google, by a Millward Brown survey on top of mind preference conducted on over a thousand Bangladeshi internet users, marking the second time the company ranked in the top 3 in the last 2 years.

2017 
Over the year 2017, Bikroy introduced their online job portal and entered an agreement with one of the ride sharing apps in Bangladesh, Pathao, as its official recruitment partner. In the annual Kantar Millward Brown survey, Bikroy lost its 3rd position rank to YouTube and is currently ranked 4th this year followed by Facebook, Google, and YouTube in Bangladesh. Keeping its promise on gender parity with the #HeForShe campaign, Bikroy grew its workplace female employee ratio by 7% from the previous year as a part of their Women's Empowerment Principles (WEPs) signatories – a collaboration between UN Women and the UN Global Compact.

2018 
For the 3rd consecutive year, Bikroy has been the top rated online marketplace among all e-commerce websites in Bangladesh. It has been awarded the “Top of Mind” award based on the results of the “Online Brand Health: Market Research Report”, which is a survey of 2400 internet users by Somra MBL Ltd.  According to the same survey, Bikroy is in 4th place among global websites in Bangladesh after Facebook, Google & YouTube. The survey results also showed that the largest share of preference by customers on its platform is for the buying and selling of mobile phones.

Bikroy partnered with Aarong to become its official recruitment partner for publishing all available job opportunities in Bikroy.com/jobs. Aarong is an enterprise of one of the largest social development organizations in Bangladesh - BRAC.

Bikroy.com has made itself a medium for the buying and selling of cattle during Qurbani – the largest religious festival in Bangladesh. Bikroy arranged “Bikroy Qurbani Show” to showcase cattle that are to be sold in its online platform as a one-day display event for Eid-Ul-Azha. The event comes to highlight with its #BiratHaat campaign to offering customers to view the sacrificial animals before purchasing them online.

Bikroy.com arranged #ILoveBangladesh story writing competition and the winners were announced in celebration of the Victory Day. The award ceremony was held on 19 December 2018, with special guests including the freedom fighter and musician martyr Altaf Mahmud's daughter Shawan Mahmud.

2019 
In the year of 2019, Bikroy made several partnerships based Bikroy Deals campaigns such as Valentine Deals with Royal Tulip Sea Pearl Beach Resort & Spa as the ‘’Hospitality Partner’’ & US-Bangla Airlines Ltd. as the ‘’Travel Partner’’, Boishakhi Deals with Minister Hi-Tech Park Limited, Ramadan Deals with Minister Hi-Tech Park Limited, HMD Global (the sole importer of Nokia in Bangladesh) and US Bangla Airlines Limited.

Bikroy launched the Biraat Haat campaign for the fifth time on the occasion of Eid-ul-Adha. 13 winners from the buyer contest participants and 3 winners from the member contest participants were selected from all over the country and were provided with gifts, courtesy of Minister Hi-Tech Park Limited.

In August 2019, Bikroy reached break-even for the first time since its 7 years of operation in Bangladesh. The company's Global CEO and Acting Managing Director Nils Hammar announced this auspicious news at the half-yearly event arranged for the employees.

In 2019, Bikroy published infographics on the Cars, Mobile and Livestock market of Bangladesh based on the data acquired from the user activity on Bikroy’s website.

Corporate social responsibility 
Bikroy joined the global list of Women's Empowerment Principles (WEPs) signatories – a collaboration between UN Women and the UN Global Compact. It joined the HeForShe movement in 2015.

Bikroy initiated a platform for their female employees - “Moner Janala”, where they can share their workplace challenges or other concerns.

Achievements 
 In 2016, Bikroy for the second time in a row was ranked in the top three internet sites in Bangladesh by Milward Brown's top of mind (TOM) survey. The survey was conducted on 1008 local internet users in Bangladesh.
 Bikroy partnered with a2i in August 2016 to implement e-commerce services, establish training institutes and create support for developing polytechnic skills for the rural people of Bangladesh.
 Bangladesh Brand Forum (BBF) awards Bikroy as the Best Online Classified Website 2016.
 Bikroy.com was awarded winner in the “Internet” category for its exceptional online presence at the 13th Employer Branding Awards Presents Bangladesh Best Employer Brand Awards 2018. Bikroy was also declared winner at the CMO Asia Presents Bangladesh Master Awards 2018 for “Brand Leadership Award” due to their outstanding brand identity and leadership for online business in Bangladesh.

References

External links
 
Bikroy Blog

Online marketplaces of Bangladesh